Mary Janice Rule (August 15, 1931 – October 17, 2003) was an American actress and psychotherapist, earning her PhD while still acting, then acting occasionally while working in her new profession.

Early life
Rule was born in Norwood, Ohio, to parents of Irish origin. Her father was a dealer in industrial diamonds. She began dancing at the Chez Paree nightclub in Chicago at age 15, which paid for ballet lessons, and was a dancer in the 1949 Broadway production of Miss Liberty. Rule also studied acting at the Chicago Professional School.

Career 
She was pictured on the cover of Life magazine on January 8, 1951, as being someone to watch in the entertainment industry. Gaining a contract by Warner Bros., her first credited screen role was as Virginia in Goodbye, My Fancy (1951), which featured Joan Crawford in the lead. The established star belittled the younger woman, making Rule's work on the film difficult, although Crawford years later wrote a letter of apology to Rule for treating her badly on this film. Rule's Warner contract was allowed to lapse after only two films. She was troubled by the attitude toward women's beauty at the studios in the early 1950s: "Because I was afraid of being robbed of my individuality, I fought with the makeup people, the hairdressers, and I didn't understand problems of the publicity department," she was reported as saying in 1957.

Rule was in the original 1953 Broadway cast of William Inge's Picnic (in the role of Madge Owens, the innocent beauty, played by Kim Novak in the film version), whose company also included Paul Newman in his Broadway debut. This commitment led her to turn down the role ultimately played by Eva Marie Saint in On the Waterfront (1954). "I knew I couldn't shoot in a movie all day and work on a stage at night and do my best in both," she was quoted as saying by Hedda Hopper of the Los Angeles Times in 1966. Among her other Broadway shows were The Flowering Peach, The Happiest Girl in the World, and Michael V. Gazzo's Night Circus, a 1958 production which lasted for only a week, but introduced Rule to Ben Gazzara, who became her third husband.

Her other films in the 1950s included A Woman's Devotion (1956), the Western Gun for a Coward (1957) and Bell, Book and Candle (1958), in which she played the fiancée who loses publisher 'Shep' Henderson (James Stewart) to the spell-casting witch Gillian Holroyd (Kim Novak). On television, she appeared in an episode of Checkmate ("The Mask of Vengeance", 1960), where she played Elena Nardos, the roommate of Cloris Leachman's character, Marilyn Parker. She was also in The Twilight Zone episode "Nightmare as a Child." She appeared as different characters in three episodes of Route 66. She acted as both Barbara Webb and Barbara Wells with David Janssen in two episodes of The Fugitive entitled "Wife Killer" and "The Walls of Night". She also had a major role as Nancy Reade in "Three Bells to Perdido", the debut episode of the Richard Boone western Have Gun – Will Travel. Rule also starred, second billing to Yul Brynner, in the western film Invitation to a Gunfighter (1964).

Among her later film roles were Emily Stewart in The Chase (1966), Sheila Sommers in The Ambushers (1967), Burt Lancaster's bitter ex-lover in The Swimmer (1968), Willie in Robert Altman's 3 Women (1977), journalist Kate Newman in Costa Gavras' political thriller Missing (1982), and Kevin Costner's mother in American Flyers (1985).

Personal life
Rule had a brief engagement to Farley Granger in 1956. They had appeared in the Broadway play The Carefree Tree in 1955. Next followed a relationship with Ralph Meeker; Meeker had played Hal in Picnic.

Rule was briefly married, during 1955, to television and film writer N. Richard Nash. Her second marriage was to television and film writer Robert Thom in 1956; they had one daughter, Kate, before divorcing in 1961. Her last marriage was to actor Ben Gazzara in 1961, having one daughter together before their divorce in 1979.

During the 1960s, she became interested in psychoanalysis. She began her formal studies in 1973, specializing in treating her fellow actors, and received her PhD 10 years later from the Southern California Psychoanalytic Institute in Los Angeles. She practiced in New York and Los Angeles, and continued to act occasionally until her death from a cerebral hemorrhage in 2003. She was cremated after her death.

Partial filmography

 Fourteen Hours (1951) - Bit Part (uncredited)
 Goodbye, My Fancy (1951) - Virginia Merrill
 Starlift (1951) - Nell Wayne
 Holiday for Sinners (1952) - Susan Corvier
 Rogue's March (1953) - Jane Wensley
 A Woman's Devotion (1956) - Stella Stevenson
 Gun for a Coward (1957) - Aud Niven
 Wagon Train ('The Zeke Thomas Story') (1957) - Maggie Thomas
 Bell, Book and Candle (1958) - Merle Kittridge
 The Subterraneans (1960) - Roxanne
 Invitation to a Gunfighter (1964) - Ruth Adams
 The Chase (1966) - Emily Stewart
 Alvarez Kelly (1966) - Liz Pickering
 Welcome to Hard Times (1967) - Molly Riordan
 The Ambushers (1967) - Sheila Sommers
 The Swimmer (1968) - Shirley Abbott
 Doctors' Wives (1971) - Amy Brennan
 Gumshoe (1971) - Mrs. Blankerscoon
 Kid Blue (1973) - Janet Conforto
 3 Women (1977) - Willie Hart
 Missing (1982) - Kate Newman
 American Flyers (1985) - Mrs. Sommers
 Rainy Day Friends (1985) - Elaine

Television roles

 General Foods 25th Anniversary Show: A Salute to Rodgers and Hammerstein (1954)
 Appointment with Adventure (1955)
 Wagon Train, episode "The Zeke Thomas Story" (1957)
 Have Gun – Will Travel, pilot episode "Three Bells to Perdido" (1957)
 The Twilight Zone, episode "Nightmare as a Child" (1960)
 Dr. Kildare, episode "Whoever Heard of a Two-Headed Doll?" (1963)
 Route 66, episodes "A Lance of Straw" (1960), "Once to Every Man" (1961), and"But What Do You Do in March?" (1963)
 The Fugitive, episodes "Wife Killer" (1966) and "The Walls of Night" (1967)
 Journey to the Unknown, episode "Stranger in the Family" (1968)
 Shadow on the Land (1968, TV movie)
 Trial Run (1969, TV movie)
 The Devil and Miss Sarah (1971, TV movie)
 The Streets of San Francisco, episode "The First Day of Forever" (1972)
 Barnaby Jones, episode "To Catch a Dead Man" (1973)
 The Word (1978, miniseries)
 The Ray Bradbury Theater (1992, Episode: "Some Live Like Lazarus") - Anna (age 60) (final appearance)

By an odd coincidence, Rule appeared in the first or second episode of four long-running television series: Have Gun – Will Travel episode 1; Route 66 episode 2; The Streets of San Francisco episode 2; and, Barnaby Jones episode 2.

References

Further reading 
 "Movies: The First Steps Up a Familiar Ladder; Janice Rule dances and smiles her way from Glen Ellyn, Ill. to Hollywood, Calif.". Life. January 8, 1951. pp. 78–79
 Rule, Janice (November 1973) "The Actor's Identity Crisis (Postanalytic Reflections of an Actress)". Mental Health Digest. pp. 54–58

External links
 
 
 

1931 births
2003 deaths
Actresses from Ohio
American film actresses
American stage actresses
American television actresses
People from Norwood, Ohio
People from Manhattan
American people of Irish descent
20th-century American actresses
21st-century American women